SSPL may refer to:

Sacred Sword of the Patriots League
Saratoga Springs Public Library, Saratoga Springs, New York
Science & Society Picture Library of the Science Museum, London
Solid State Physics Laboratory
Space Shuttle Payload Launcher, a DRAGONSat satellite
Server Side Public License, a software license